The SPL Keski-Suomen piiri (Central Finland Football Association) is one of the 12 district organisations of the Football Association of Finland. It administers lower tier football in Central Finland.

Background 

Suomen Palloliitto Keski-Suomen piiri, commonly referred to as SPL Keski-Suomen piiri or SPL Keski-Suomi, is the governing body for football in Central Finland.  Based in Jyväskylä, the Association's Director is Ari Matinlassi.

Member clubs

League Competitions 
SPL Keski-Suomen piiri run the following league competitions:

Men's Football
 Division 3 - Kolmonen  -  one section
 Division 4 - Nelonen  -  one section
 Division 5 - Vitonen  -  one section

Ladies Football
 Division 3 - Kolmonen  -  one section

Footnotes

References

External links 
 SPL Keski-Suomen piiri Official Website 

K